The UK Cyber Security Forum is a social enterprise spanning the United Kingdom, representing small and medium-sized enterprises (SMEs) in the UK cyber sector.  It is divided up into 20 regional cyber clusters which provide free membership and events for their members.  It forms part of the UK cyber security community. The Forum has been praised by UK Government for helping to address the cyber skills gap faced by the U.K.  The concept of providing regional cyber security clusters was then later supported and laid out by the U.K Government Cyber Security Strategy in late 2014.

National news has reported on the effectiveness of the forum, especially in terms of aiding collaboration between UK cyber companies.  There has been considerable coverage of certain cyber clusters such as the London Cyber Cluster which has featured heavily in the media.

The Cyber Clusters 
There are currently 20 official cyber clusters in the U.K supported by the U.K Government.

References

External links 
 
 http://www.securitynewsdesk.com/cyber-security-companies-meet-oversubscribed-uk-cyber-security-forum-event/
 https://crarisk.com/cra-continues-to-increase-awareness-in-the-uk-cyber-security-forum/
 https://www.wired.co.uk/article/wired-security-london-cyber-security-scene-uk-startups
 https://www.ukcybersecurity.co.uk

Computer security organizations
Cybercrime in the United Kingdom
Non-profit organisations based in the United Kingdom
Social enterprises